Assassination City Roller Derby (ACRD) is a women's flat-track roller derby league based in Plano, Texas. Assassination City is a founding member of the Women's Flat Track Derby Association (WFTDA).

Founded in 2005, the league consists of four home teams and two travel teams. The home teams compete against each other in league play during the official home season, which typically runs from February to September. The league's All-Star Skaters make up the travel team, called Conspiracy. This group of skaters compete at the interleague level, against teams from other leagues and cities. The games or bouts played at this level affect the league's overall ranking among the top teams in the WFTDA.

Founded in 2005, ACRD has become active not only as competitors in the roller derby community, but as participants in the local community.

The 2011 season was moved to the Fair Park Coliseum, where it attracted 2,000 fans to its first bout. At the close of the 2013 season Assassination City returned to its roller rink roots at Broadway Skateland, where they played to a packed house and a sold-out crowd for the 2014 season opener, held February 8, 2014. February 2015 ushered the amateur sport into Plano, TX at Thunderbird Roller Rink.

WFTDA competition

Rankings

References

Sports in Dallas
Roller derby leagues established in 2005
Roller derby leagues in Texas
2005 establishments in Texas
Plano, Texas